JRN may refer to:
 Japan Radio Network
 JRN-Solutions, in Germany
 Jhalar railway station, in Pakistan
 Jiran, Madhya Pradesh, India
 Jones Radio Networks
 Juruena Airport, in Brazil